Robert R. Dodds (27 July 1924 – 1 January 1998) was an American politician.

A Burlington, Iowa, native born on 27 July 1924 to parents Horace Dodds and Florence Hillgartner, Robert R. Dodds graduated from Danville High School in 1942. After serving in the United States Army Air Forces for two and a half years during World War II, Dodds enrolled at Burlington Junior College. He was a farmer and owned an eponymous insurance agency.

Dodds was elected to three two-year terms as a Democratic legislator on the Iowa House of Representatives for District 21 from 1957 to 1963. He subsequently served two consecutive terms on the Iowa Senate for District 7 until 1971. Dodds then became a minister for the Bonaparte Baptist Church, served in the Burlington Police Department Chaplain Corps, held a chaplaincy for the Burlington Bees and worked as chaplain coordinator for the Midwest League. Additionally, Dodds established several local religious organizations, publications, and initiatives. He served on the board for a number of local groups as well, such as the Salvation Army, the Danville Bank and school system, and the Southeastern Community College Foundation. Dodds died of pneumonia complications at University of Iowa Hospitals and Clinics on 1 January 1998, aged 73.

References

Military personnel from Iowa
United States Army Air Forces personnel of World War II
Southeastern Community College (Iowa) alumni
20th-century Baptist ministers from the United States
Baptists from Iowa
Farmers from Iowa
Democratic Party Iowa state senators
School board members in Iowa
Democratic Party members of the Iowa House of Representatives
1924 births
1998 deaths
20th-century American politicians
American businesspeople in insurance
Businesspeople from Iowa
Politicians from Burlington, Iowa
20th-century American businesspeople
American company founders